Barbara Bell may refer to:
 Barbara Bell (educationalist)
 Barbara Bell (astronomer)